The Finnish Armoured Division (PsD or Ps. D) was a division of the Finnish Army during the Continuation War.

Foundation
The Finnish Supreme headquarters ordered the foundation of an armoured division on 28 June 1942 and the actual foundation was on 30 June 1942. The division consisted of the newly formed Armoured Brigade and the old (1st) Jaeger Brigade. The Cavalry Brigade was also part of the division until January 1943. The division artillery consisted of the 14th Heavy Artillery Battalion. The division commander was Major General Ruben Lagus. During most of the war, the division was located at Petrozavodsk, but in the spring of 1944 it was moved to the Karelian Isthmus to form the reserve of the headquarters.

Battles
Battle of Kuuterselkä, Continuation War, June 1944
Battle of Tali-Ihantala, Continuation War
Battle of Vuosalmi, Continuation War, July 1944
Battle of Rovaniemi, Lapland War, October 1944

Order of battle 1944

 HQ of the Armoured Division
 Armoured Brigade
 1st Armoured Battalion (T-26, T-26E), Armoured car company with FAIs and BA-10s
 2nd Armoured Battalion (T-26, T-26E, heavy company with KV-1 heavy tanks, T-28 and T-34 medium tanks)
 Armoured AA Battery (Landsverk Anti II self-propelled anti-aircraft guns)
 Assault Gun Battalion (StuG IIIG)
 Armoured Training Battalion (older types and a few T-26s)
 Jaeger Brigade
 2nd Jaeger Battalion
 3rd Jaeger Battalion
 4th Jaeger Battalion
 5th Jaeger Battalion
 Armoured Jaeger Battalion (towed 50mm Pak 38 and 75mm Pak 40 anti-tank guns)
 14th Heavy Artillery Battalion
 6th Signals Battalion
 2nd Pioneer Battalion
 Separate Armour Company (BT-42 assault guns)

Disbanding
The Armoured Division was disbanded during the Lapland War on 30 December 1944.

References

 Jäntti, Lauri: Kannaksen suurtaisteluissa kesällä 1944 – "Kesäsodan" taustaa, tapahtumia ja lähikuvia patterinpäällikön näkökulmasta, 3. painos, WSOY, 1956
Robert Brantberg: Tank General Ruben Lagus

Continuation War
Divisions of Finland
Military units and formations established in 1942
Military units and formations disestablished in 1944
Military units and formations of Finland in World War II
Armoured divisions of World War II